Remains of Elmet is a collection of poems by Ted Hughes published in 1979. In this book Hughes has poetically covered the region of Elmet. The book contains black and white photographs by Fay Godwin, taken in the barren hill country of West Yorkshire, Hughes's birthplace.

The book was re-published by Faber and Faber in 1994, re-titled as Elmet, with a third of the book comprising additional new poems and photographs.

References

Further reading
https://www.bl.uk/collection-items/remains-of-elmet-by-ted-hughes-with-photographs-by-fay-godwin

1979 poetry books
English poetry collections
Books about England
Poetry by Ted Hughes